Saint-Leu is a commune in the French overseas department of Réunion. It is located on the west coast of the island of Réunion.

Geography

Climate

Saint-Leu has a humid subtropical climate (Köppen climate classification Cwa) closely bordering on a subtropical highland climate (Cwb).

Population

Sports

Surf 
It is a well-known surf spot.  Various surfing competitions have been held in Saint-Leu, including World Qualifying Series (WQS) and ASP World Tour (WCT) competitions.
It is well known for its famous left wave.

Paragliding 
There is a paragliding base at Colimaçons.
Paragliding World Cup races have been held in Saint-Leu in 2003 and 2006, and Pre World Cup Tour race in 2010 and 2015.
In 2016 the city will held again a Paragliding World Cup race (October 2016).

Points of interest
 Conservatoire botanique national de Mascarin
 Kélonia Marine Turtle Station
 Museum Stella Matutina

Neighborhoods of Saint Leu 
 Downtown Saint-Leu
 Chaloupe Saint-Leu
 Pointe au Sel
 Bras Mouton;
 Bac en fer
 Cap Saint-Leu
 La Fontaine
 L'Etang Saint-Leu
 La Pointe des Châteaux
 Les Colimaçons
 Le Plate
 Grand Fond
 Stella Matutina
 Le Portail
 Piton Saint-Leu

Gallery

See also
Communes of the Réunion department

References

External links

  

 
Communes of Réunion
Surfing locations in Réunion